The Wiener's attack, named after cryptologist Michael J. Wiener, is a type of cryptographic attack against RSA. The attack uses the continued fraction method to expose the private key d when d is small.

Background on RSA 

Fictional characters Alice and Bob are people who want to communicate securely. More specifically, Alice wants to send a message to Bob which only Bob can read. First Bob chooses two primes p and q. Then he calculates the RSA modulus N = pq. This RSA modulus is made public together with the encryption exponent e. N  and e form the public key pair (e, N). By making this information public, anyone can encrypt messages to Bob. The decryption exponent d satisfies , where  denotes the Carmichael function, though sometimes , the Euler’s phi function, is used (note: this is the order of the multiplicative group , which is not necessarily a cyclic group). The encryption exponent e and  also must be relatively prime so that there is a modular inverse. The factorization of N and the private key d are kept secret, so that only Bob can decrypt the message. We denote the private key pair as (d, N).

Using the Euclidean algorithm, one can efficiently recover the secret key d if one knows the factorization of N. By having the secret key d, one can efficiently factor the modulus of N.

Small private key 

In the RSA cryptosystem, Bob might tend to use a small value of d, rather than a large random number to improve the RSA decryption performance. However, Wiener’s attack shows that choosing a small value for d will result in an insecure system in which an attacker can recover all secret information, i.e., break the RSA system. This break is based on Wiener’s Theorem, which holds for small values of d. Wiener has proved that the attacker may efficiently find d when .

Wiener's paper also presented some countermeasures against his attack that allow fast decryption. Two techniques are described as follows.

When  is large enough, i.e. , then Wiener’s attack can not be applied regardless of how small  is.

1.
2. The result of  satisfies  as needed. The point is that Wiener’s attack does not apply here because the value of   can be large.

How Wiener's attack works 

Note that

where  

Since

,

there exists an integer K such that

.
Divided by : 
, where .

However, a method of checking and guess is still required.

By using simple algebraic manipulations and identities, a guess can be checked for accuracy.

Wiener's theorem 
Let . 

Example 

Suppose that the public keys are 
The attack shall determine . 
Note that this algorithm finds fractions in their lowest terms.
We know that

However, the convergent  yields

Now, if we solve the equation

Therefore we have found the factorization

.
Notice that, for the modulus , Wiener's Theorem will work if 
.

Proof of Wiener's theorem 
The proof is based on approximations using continued fractions. 
Since , there exists a  such that . Therefore

.

Although the attacker does not know , he may use  to approximate it. Indeed, since

Using  in place of  we obtain:

Now, so . Since , so , then we obtain:   

Hence we obtain:

 (1) 

Since  then , we obtain:

, so (2) 
From (1) and (2), we can conclude that

Therefore the algorithm will indeed eventually find .

References

Further reading 
 Coppersmith, Don (1996). Low-Exponent RSA with Related Messages. Springer-Verlag Berlin Heidelberg.

 Dujella, Andrej (2004). Continued Fractions and RSA with Small Secret Exponent.
 Python Implementation of Wiener's Attack.
 

Asymmetric-key algorithms
Cryptographic attacks
Attacks on public-key cryptosystems